MES Kuttippuram is an English medium private high school in Thrikkanapuram, Kuttippuram, Kerala, India.

The MES Kuttippuram unit started the Kindergarten classes in 1991 at Chembikkal, 3 km west of Kuttippuram. As the site was inconvenient and accommodation insufficient, next year the school was shifted to a rented building at South Bazaar, Kuttippuram. In the meantime, MES committee purchased two acres of land at the southern end of Kuttippuram, at Thrikkanapuram in Thavanoor panchayat. The MES College of Engineering took over the school as the Campus school of the college. The construction work of the first block of the school building was completed in May 1998 and school started functioning in the new building from next month.

High schools and secondary schools in Kerala
Schools in Malappuram district